Volkovoyno is a rural locality (a village) in Vtorovskoye Rural Settlement, Kameshkovsky District, Vladimir Oblast, Russia. The population was 552 as of 2010. There are 2 streets.

Geography 
Volkovoyno is located 5 km south of Kameshkovo (the district's administrative centre) by road. Kameshkovo is the nearest rural locality.

References 

Rural localities in Kameshkovsky District